Four Chords & Several Years Ago is the seventh album by American rock band Huey Lewis and the News, released in 1994. The title is a play on the first sentence in Abraham Lincoln's Gettysburg Address ("Four score and seven years ago ...").

It is a collection of 1950s and 1960s rhythm & blues covers influential to the members of the group during their early years. It is the last album to feature founding member and bassist, Mario Cipollina, who left the band after the subsequent tour.

Track listing
"Shake, Rattle and Roll" (Charles E. Calhoun) – 3:07
"Blue Monday" (Dave Bartholomew, Fats Domino) – 2:41
"Searching for My Love" (Bobby Moore) – 2:50
"(She's) Some Kind of Wonderful" (John Ellison) – 3:06
"But It's Alright" (J.J. Jackson, Pierre Tubbs) – 2:54
"If You Gotta Make a Fool of Somebody" (Rudy Clark) – 2:32
"Mother in Law" (Allen Toussaint) – 2:43
"Little Bitty Pretty One" (Robert Byrd) – 2:04
"Good Morning Little School Girl" (Sonny Boy Williamson) (credited as "S.L. Hopkins")– 4:02
"Stagger Lee" (Harold Logan, Lloyd Price) – 2:36
"She Shot a Hole in My Soul" (Mac Gayden, Chuck Neese) – 2:38
"Surely I Love You" (James Bracken, Marion Oliver) – 2:51
"You Left the Water Running" (Oscar Franck, Rick Hall, Dan Penn) – 3:06
"Your Cash Ain't Nothin' But Trash" (Charles E. Calhoun) – 2:57
"Function at the Junction" (Edward Holland, Jr. Shorty Long) – 3:13
"Better to Have and Not Need" (Don Covay, Erskin Watts) – 3:32
"Going Down Slow" (St. Louis Jimmy Oden) – 2:00

Personnel 

Huey Lewis & The News
 Huey Lewis – lead vocals, harmonica
 Mario Cipollina – bass
 Johnny Colla – rhythm guitar, saxophone, backing vocals
 Bill Gibson – drums, percussion, backing vocals
 Chris Hayes – lead guitar, backing vocals
 Sean Hopper – keyboards, backing vocals

Additional personnel
 Marvin McFadden – trumpet (4-7, 10, 11, 13)
 Linda Tillery – backing vocals (4, 6, 10, 11, 15, 16)
 Jeanie Tracy – backing vocals (4, 6, 10, 11, 15, 16)

Production
 Producer – Stewart Levine
 Executive Producer – Bob Brown
 Engineer – Daren Klein
 Assistant Engineers – Jim Champagne, Kevin Scott and Jim "Watts" Vereecke.
 Recorded at The Site (San Rafael, CA) and Studio D Recording (Sausalito, CA).
 Mixed by Daren Klein at Ocean Way Recording (Hollywood, CA).
 Mastered by Bernie Grundman at Bernie Grundman Mastering (Hollywood, CA).
 Technicians – Ralph Arista and Jim Moran
 Art Direction – Robin Lynch
 Design – JoDee Stringham
 Photography – Dennis Keeley
 Management – Bob Brown Management

Charts

Singles - Billboard (United States)

References 

1994 albums
Huey Lewis and the News albums
Albums produced by Stewart Levine
Covers albums
Elektra Records albums
Rhythm and blues albums by American artists